Yuxiang shredded pork (sometimes translated as fish-flavored pork slices, or more vaguely as shredded pork with garlic sauce) is a common dish in Sichuan cuisine. Yuxiang is one of the main traditional flavors in Sichuan.

History

Hostess theory 
One day, while cooking dinner, it is said that a hostess who had just finished cooking fish poured the fish seasoning into a different pot, in which pork was already being made.  When her husband came home from work, so hungry that he started eating immediately,  He began to impatiently ask his wife how it had been made. After her husband's repeated questioning, she finally relayed what happened, and this unintentional innovation eventually spread.

War theory 
Some people say that Yuxiang shredded pork is an innovative dish in modern China, because 1,328 Sichuan-style dishes were included in the "Chengdu Overview" published in 1909, but there was no Yuxiang shredded pork. Moreover, the name "Yuxiang Shredded Pork" was named after Chiang Kai-shek's chef during the Anti-Japanese War. Due to the shortage of materials during the war, many ingredients were also replaced with cheap ingredients, but the dishes were sweet, spicy, salty and fresh, so they were called "Yuxiang pork shreds".

Characteristics 
Yuxiang (sometimes translated as "fish flavor") is made of pao la jiao (泡椒 'Sichuan pickled chili pepper'), chuan seasoning salt, soy sauce (regular light), white sugar, bruised ginger, garlic and green star but no fish. This seasoning has nothing to do with fish, instead imitating the seasoning and method that people in Sichuan use when cooking fish. The seasoning contains salty, sweet, sour, hot, and fresh tastes, making the food more delicious.

Preparation 

In order to make Yuxiang Shredded Pork, some raw ingredients are indispensable.

Main raw materials 
Pork

water, vinegar, ginger, garlic, pickled pepper

sugar, salt, oil, cooking wine, soy sauce.

Variation

Ingredients 
With increase of life quality, people add different ingredients into Yuxiang Shredded Pork to make more delicious, such as black fungus, carrots, etc. However, no matter what kind of changes make to this dishes. Its major ingredient is pork. People select and use thirty percent fat and seventy percent lean pork, shredding and frying, which can make the food softer.

Various Dishes of Yuxiang 
With the improvement of people's living standards and the acceptance of fish-flavored taste gradually improved, the Yuxiang Shredded Pork was spread over different part of China. People in different regions also made different innovations in Yuxiang dishes, according to their eating habits and regional characteristics. Other dishes using Yuxiang have also appeared, for example, as Yuxiang Pork Liver, Yuxiang Eggplant, and Yuxiang Three Silk (pork silk, Tofu silk, green pepper silk). .

Gallery

See also
 List of pork dishes

References

External links
 Example of video recipe

Sichuan cuisine
Chinese pork dishes